The 2022 OFC Women's Nations Cup was the 12th edition of the OFC Women's Nations Cup (also known as the OFC Women's Championship), the
quadrennial international football championship organised by the Oceania Football Confederation (OFC) for the women's national teams of the Oceanian region. It was originally scheduled from July to August 2022, but was moved to January and February to accommodate changes to the FIFA Women's International Match Calendar. The OFC announced on 4 March 2021 that it was pushed back due to the COVID-19 pandemic, and on 29 April 2022 announced that Fiji would host the tournament from 13 to 30 July.

The tournament served as Oceania's qualifiers to the 2023 FIFA Women's World Cup in Australia and New Zealand. With New Zealand having already qualified automatically for the World Cup as a co-host, they did not participate in the tournament. The winner advanced to the inter-confederation play-offs.

New Zealand were the reigning champions, but did not defend their title and did not participate in the tournament. Papua New Guinea won their first OFC Women's Nations Cup title.

Format
The format of the tournament involved a first round with nine teams playing three groups of three, with the top two in each group plus the two best third-place teams advancing to the quarter-finals. Fiji was picked to be the host in April 2022.

Tiebreakers
The ranking of teams is determined as follows:

 Points obtained in all qualifying matches;
 Goal difference in all qualifying matches;
 Number of goals scored in all qualifying matches;
 Points obtained in the matches played between the teams in question;
 Goal difference in the matches played between the teams in question;
 Number of goals scored in the matches played between the teams in question;
 Fair play points in all qualifying matches (only one deduction can be applied to a player in a single match): 
 Coin toss or drawing of lots.

Teams

New Zealand will not participate with their World Cup spot already assured. American Samoa were unable to participate due to ongoing issues from the pandemic. All other countries in the OFC will participate.

Venue
All matches were played at the ANZ Stadium in Suva, on the island of Viti Levu.

Draw
The draw for the group stage was held on 10 May with teams seeded into pots based upon the 25 March FIFA rankings.

Squads

Match officials
On 12 July 2022, the OFC announced the list of match officials for the tournament.

During the tournament, Veer Singh and Neeshil Varman (Fiji) were assigned as referees.

Referees

 Torika Delai
 Veer Singh
 Neeshil Varman
 Anna-Marie Keighley
 Beth Rattray
 Shama Maemae
 Delvin Joel

Assistant referees

 Adi Gadolo
 Jemima Rao
 Allys Clipsham
 Sarah Jones
 Heloise Simons
 Stephanie Minan
 Maria Salamasina
 Natalia Lumukana
 Vaihina Teura
 Lata Kaumatule
 Feliuaki Kolotau

Group stage
All match times are local (UTC+12).

Group A

Group B

Group C

Ranking of third-placed teams

Knockout stage

Bracket

Quarter-finals

Semi-finals

Third place match

Final

The winner will advance to the inter-confederation playoffs.

Goalscorers

Awards

Qualified teams for FIFA Women's World Cup
The sole OFC direct berth for the 2023 FIFA Women's World Cup was given to New Zealand, who qualified automatically as co-hosts.

References

External links
OFC Women's Nations Cup 2022, at Oceania Football Confederation

2022
2022 in women's association football
2023 FIFA Women's World Cup qualification
July 2022 sports events in Oceania
Women's Nations Cup
2022 in Fijian sport
Association football events postponed due to the COVID-19 pandemic
2022 OFC Women's